The Sledding Hill is a 2005 post-modern metafictional novel by young adult writer Chris Crutcher. By having the novel narrated by a super-omniscient dead boy and placing himself into the novel, Crutcher has written a work that encompasses two literary fads.

Plot summary

The novel is narrated by the late Billy Bartholomew, the best friend of the protagonist, Eddie Proffit. Eddie is an intelligent boy who is seemingly afflicted with ADHD. After the death of two important figures of his life in quick succession, his father and his best friend, Eddie refuses to speak. He begins talking again when he testifies in front of the Red Brick Church announcing he will not only not join the church, but will also speak in favor of Warren Peece at the school board meeting. A misinterpretation of his testimony compels the church members to have Eddie placed into a mental health facility supposedly because Eddie thinks he is Jesus Christ. Crutcher places himself in the novel's climax as a speaker at the board meeting on the removal of the book.

Major themes
A frequent target of censors, Crutcher touches on many of his familiar themes in this work: literary and intellectual freedom along with freedom of speech, religious prejudice, mental disabilities and homosexuality. Oddly, though many of his previous works are challenged on the basis of language being inappropriate for the intended audience, there is no objectionable language in The Sledding Hill (besides a brief mention of huevos, male testicles in Spanish). Crutcher has said that he did this intentionally so that censors would not have bad language as a reason to hide behind their disagreement with the book's content, so the only reason it could be banned would be for its subject matter.

External links
 About Crutcher

2005 American novels
American young adult novels

Novels by Chris Crutcher